LiquidPlanner, Inc. is an online project management software company based in Seattle. The firm was founded in 2006 and launched their first beta release to the public in 2008.

LiquidPlanner is a platform-independent, online project management system which features range estimates (e.g. 3–5 days) to express the uncertainty in project schedules.
This collaborative software is accessible via modern web browsers and mobile applications for iPhone, iPad, and Android operating system-based devices.

History 
LiquidPlanner was founded by Charles Seybold and Jason Carlson in 2006. LiquidPlanner launched a public beta at the DEMO 08 conference. The Alliance of Angels named LiquidPlanner “Company of the Year” in May 2011. LiquidPlanner also received the “Innovation Award” from Info-Tech Research Group in 2011 and 2012. 

In November 2017, Todd Humphrey became CEO of the company, replacing Liz Pearce. In 2018, the company got $2 million in funding from investors.

In February 2020, LiquidPlanner was dubbed by Purch Group's Business News Daily as the best online project management software for analyzing overall company data in 2020.

Software 
Built using Ruby on Rails, LiquidPlanner is the industry’s only priority-based, predictive online project management solution and claims to be the first software as a service (SaaS) based project management solution to allow users to express uncertainty in their task estimates using ranges. The application employs a probabilistic scheduling engine that is claimed to build more accurate schedules.

Several authors have noted that estimating in ranges (e.g. 3–4 days, 1–3 hours) is preferable to single point estimates (e.g. 1 hour, 2 days).
Steve McConnell states "simplistic single-point estimates are meaningless because they don't include any indication of the probability associated with the single-point." Project management and scheduling methodologies such as Program Evaluation and Review Technique (PERT) generate best-case/worst-case ranges.  However the preponderance of popular project management software does not readily accept ranges as inputs for estimates.

LiquidPlanner accepts ranges as estimates and infers a probability distribution from that range.
It then uses the distributions and the relationships between tasks and people to calculate a distribution for the project as a whole. By exposing the uncertainty in estimates the developers of LiquidPlanner claim that the uncertainty can then be managed. It then tracks the evolution of these estimates over time.
From these uncertainty measures over time it can plot the history of the project estimates. This type of plot is often referred to as the Cone of Uncertainty.

Project managers create work spaces and invite users to participate in a way similar to LinkedIn or Facebook. The workspace can contain multiple projects and keeps a running narrative of tasks, comments, documents, and other project collateral.

In September 2011, LiquidPlanner introduced their free mobile app that connects the LiquidPlanner online project management workspace to the Apple iPhone and iPad. This app is available through the Apple iTunes Store. Significant updates to its mobile app were made in April 2013.

The LiquidPlanner application programming interface (API) enables project managers to programmatically interact with their LiquidPlanner workspace. With the API, most of the LiquidPlanner project management actions can be automated. For example, you can create a task and then post comments, track time against it, and mark the task done when completed.

LiquidPlanner was founded in 2006. released its first public beta in 2008,

Funding
LiquidPlanner is privately held. It was the first recipient of capital from the Seattle-based Alliance of Angels seed fund in June 2009.

See also
 Comparison of time-tracking software

References 

Project management software
Software companies based in Seattle
Online companies of the United States
Software companies of the United States
2006 establishments in Washington (state)
Software companies established in 2006